Islamic Way of Life (Urdu: Islam Ka Nizam Hayat) is a book written by prominent Muslim Sayyid Abul Ala Maududi in Lahore, 1948.

Editions
Publisher: Islamic Foundation (UK) reprint of 2001, Pages: 80 Binding: Paperback

References

External links
 Islamic Way of Life Khurshid Ahmad, Khurram Murad (Editor).
 The Islamic Way of Life at al-islamforall.org

Books by Sayyid Abul Ala Maududi